Qasr Libya or Theodoureas is a small town in northern Libya about  northwest of Bayda. In ancient times, it was called Olbia and Theodorias, the ruins of which were excavated in the 1950s.  The town contains a museum with fifty Byzantine mosaics. It's on the cross-roads between the eastwards Marj–Bayda main road, and the southwards Qasr Libya–Marawa road.

Notes

External links 

 Livius.org: Theodorias (Qasr Libya)

Populated places in Jabal al Akhdar
Cyrenaica